The Finn was a sailing event on the Sailing at the 1964 Summer Olympics program in Enoshima. Seven races were scheduled. 33 sailors on 33 boats, from 33 nations competed.

Results 

DNF = Did Not Finish, DNS= Did Not Start, DSQ = Disqualified 
 = Male,  = Female

Daily standings

Conditions at Enoshima 
Of the total of three race areas were needed during the Olympics in Enoshima. Each of the classes was using the same scoring system. The center course was used for the Finn.

Notes

References 
 sports-reference
 
 
 
 

 

Finn
Finn competitions